The Russian Mixed Doubles Curling Cup are the annual national curling tournament for mixed doubles curling in Russia. It has been held annually since 2008 (usually in August and/or September, it's an opening event in Russian mixed doubles season), organized by Russian Curling Federation. As of 2022, the event consisted of twenty teams participating in a preliminary round robin and a single-knockout playoff.

Past champions

References

External links
Russian Curling Federation
Curling in Russia (web archive)

See also
Russian Curling Championships
Russian Mixed Doubles Curling Championship

 
Mixed doubles
Recurring sporting events established in 2008